An uplink is a telecommunications link.

Uplink may refer to:

 Uplink (video game), a 2001 "hacking simulation" video game released by Introversion Software
 Half-Life: Uplink, a 1998 demo version of the Half-Life video game
UpLink, a 2020 open-source platform by World Economic Forum